Vanita Kayiwa, is a Ugandan airline transport pilot, who serves as a first officer at Uganda National Airlines Company, Uganda's national carrier airline, on the A330-841 aircraft, since February 2021. Before that, effective April 2019, she served as a first officer on the CRJ 900 equipment, at the same airline.

Background and education
She was born in Buziga, a neighborhood in Makindye Division, in Kampala, Uganda's capital and largest city. She obtained her Commercial pilot licence from the East African Civil Aviation Academy, in Soroti, in the Eastern Region of Uganda.

More recently, she has successfully  completed type rating training on the CRJ900 at CAE Phoenix, in Mesa, Arizona, United States. In 2019, she was a member of the cockpit crew that piloted the inaugural flight from Entebbe International Airport to Kilimanjaro International Airport,  on the CRJ900.

In 2020, she was among the pilots selected to train on the A330-800 aircraft. She successfully completed the type rating training at Airbus Training Centre in Miami, Florida, during the fourth quarter of that year.

Career
Kayiwa has spent most of her flying career at Air Serv Limited, piloting Cessna 208 Caravans. She first flew as a first officer, before she was promoted to captain on the Cessna 208, in 2016. She is the first Ugandan woman to make captain at Air Serv Limited, since that airline was founded in 1987. In April 2019, she was hired by Uganda National Airlines Company, as one of a small number of female pilots at the airline. She was part of the cockpit crew that made the inaugural flight between Entebbe, Uganda (EBB) and Kilimanjaro, Tanzania (KIA), in 2019.

As of February 2021, she was one of the five female pilots at Uganda Airlines, out of a total of 50 aviators. At that time, she and Tina Drazu were the only two female pilots who were part of the cockpit crew on the A330-841 equipment at Uganda Airlines.

See also
 Michael Etiang
 Tina Drazu
 Rita Nasirumbi
 Esther Mbabazi

Notes

References

External links
 UTB ready to work with Uganda Airlines to promote country – Ajarova As of 23 April 2019.
 Brief Profile
 Meet The Two Women Pilots Flying The Uganda Airlines A330-800neo

Living people
Year of birth missing (living people)
Ugandan aviators
Women aviators
People from Kampala
People from Central Region, Uganda
East African Civil Aviation Academy alumni
Ganda people
Commercial aviators
Women commercial aviators